Brnjica may refer to:
 Brnjica (Golubac), Serbia
 Brnjica (Knić), Serbia
 Brnjica (Pale), Bosnia and Herzegovina
 Brnjica (Sjenica), Serbia
 Brnjica, Živinice, Bosnia and Herzegovina